Roaring Mountain is in Yellowstone National Park in the U.S. state of Wyoming. Roaring Mountain was named for the numerous fumaroles on the western slope of the peak which during the early 1900s were loud enough to be heard for several miles.

References

Geothermal features of Yellowstone National Park
Mountains of Yellowstone National Park
Mountains of Wyoming
Geothermal features of Park County, Wyoming
Mountains of Park County, Wyoming